Perfect Stranger was an American country music band founded in 1986 in the state of Texas by Steve Murray (lead vocals), Andy Ginn (drums), Shayne Morrison (bass guitar) and Richard Raines (guitar). After several years of performing throughout Texas, the quartet released an independent album in 1994; this album was later picked up by Curb Records, who re-packaged and re-released it a year later. By 1995, its second single (entitled "You Have the Right to Remain Silent") had become a Top 5 hit on the Billboard Hot Country Singles & Tracks (now Hot Country Songs) charts.

Although Perfect Stranger never entered Top 40 on the country charts again, the band continued to perform and record throughout the 1990s, charting several more singles before eventually exiting Curb in the late 1990s. In addition, Andy Ginn was replaced by Marty Arbter on drums. Perfect Stranger returned to Curb to release its second album, The Hits, in 2001, and was dropped again afterward. As of 2009, the band is composed of co-lead singers/guitarists Marcus Eldridge and Clint Williams, bassist Shayne Morrison, lead guitarist Chad Ware, and drummer Doug Martin. A third album, Shake the World, was released in 2009. Morrison briefly re-established the band in 2010 with Murray, Raines, and new drummer Scott Zucknick.

Biography
Perfect Stranger was founded in 1986 in Carthage, Texas by Steve Murray (lead vocals), Shayne Morrison (bass guitar), Richard Raines (lead guitar), and Andy Ginn (drums). They originally performed as Midnight Express before assuming the name Perfect Stranger. The four artists played together throughout the state of Texas, mostly in clubs and at rodeos. In December 1994, they released an independent album on the Pacific label, entitled It's Up to You. Featured on it was the single "Ridin' the Rodeo". Written by Vince Gill and Kostas, the song was considered the biggest independent country music hit in the United States at the time, although it never reached the Billboard charts.

A second single, entitled "You Have the Right to Remain Silent", followed soon afterward. By the time of its release, Perfect Stranger's success as an independent act had been noticed by Curb Records, who acquired the band's debut album and its single. Curb continued promoting "You Have the Right to Remain Silent". It's Up to You was then re-packaged and re-released in 1995 as You Have the Right to Remain Silent, the band's major-label debut. By the middle of the year, its title track had reached No. 4 on the country music charts, and No. 61 on the Billboard Hot 100.

They were nominated in 1996 at the Academy of Country Music for the Top New Vocal Group award, along with 4 Runner and Lonestar, but lost to Lonestar. 

Throughout the 1990s and into the 2000s, Perfect Stranger continued to chart singles on occasion, although none of their other singles entered Top 40 on the country music charts. By the end of the 1990s, Andy Ginn had departed, with Marty Arbter taking over on drums. They eventually left Curb in the late 1990s, but rejoined the label in the early 2000s.

The band's second album, The Hits, was issued in 2001, also on Curb. This album included a re-recording of "You Have the Right to Remain Silent", as well as "Fire When Ready" and "A Little Bit More of Your Love", which had charted in 1997. The album also produced two more non-charting singles in its title track (co-written by former MCA Records artist Marty Brown) and "Miracle". After these two, the band exited Curb again.

All of the original members except Morrison eventually left. They were replaced by co-lead vocalists Clint Williams and Marcus Eldridge, Chad Ware (guitar), and Doug Martin (drums). A third album, Shake the World, was released on June 2, 2009 via Smith Music Group.

Original members Morrison, Raines and Murray briefly re-established in 2010 with new drummer Scott Zucknick.

Richard Raines died on June 1, 2013 at his home in Mineola, Texas following a long battle with depression.  He was 48.

Discography

Albums

Singles

Music videos

Nominations
Academy of Country Music
 1995 Top New Vocal Duo or Group

References

Country music groups from Texas
Curb Records artists
Musical groups established in 1986
1986 establishments in Texas
People from Carthage, Texas